The 2000 UMass Minutemen football team represented the University of Massachusetts Amherst in the 2000 NCAA Division I-AA football season as a member of the Atlantic 10 Conference.  The team was coached by Mark Whipple and played its home games at Warren McGuirk Alumni Stadium in Hadley, Massachusetts. The 2000 Minutemen failed to reach the postseason for the first time since 1997. UMass finished the season with a record of 7–4 overall and 5–3 in conference play.

Schedule

Roster

References

UMass
UMass Minutemen football seasons
UMass Minutemen football